Francine Lemire is a Canadian cross-country skier. She represented Canada at the 1984 Winter Paralympics and at the 1988 Winter Paralympics, both held in Innsbruck, Austria.

In total she won two gold medals, both at the 1988 Winter Paralympics.

Lemire won the gold medals in the women's short distance 5 km LW3/4/9 and women's long distance 10 km LW3/4/9 events.

References 

Living people
Year of birth missing (living people)
Place of birth missing (living people)
Canadian female cross-country skiers
Cross-country skiers at the 1984 Winter Paralympics
Cross-country skiers at the 1988 Winter Paralympics
Medalists at the 1988 Winter Paralympics
Paralympic bronze medalists for Canada
Paralympic cross-country skiers of Canada
Paralympic medalists in cross-country skiing